The positions of the feet in ballet is a fundamental part of classical ballet technique that defines standard placements of feet on the floor. There are five basic positions in modern-day classical ballet, known as the first through fifth positions. In 1725, dancing master Pierre Rameau credited the codification of these five positions to choreographer Pierre Beauchamp.  Two additional positions, known as the sixth and seventh positions, were codified by Serge Lifar in the 1930s while serving as Ballet Master at the Paris Opéra Ballet, though their use is limited to Lifar's choreographies. The sixth and seventh positions were not Lifar's inventions, but revivals of positions that already existed in the eighteenth century, when there were ten positions of the feet in classical ballet.

Five basic positions
The first basic position requires the feet to be flat on the floor and turned out (pointing in opposite directions as a result of rotating the legs at the hips).

First position

Heels together, and toes going outwards.

Second position

The feet point in opposite directions, with heels spaced approximately twelve inches apart.

Third position

One foot is placed in front of the other so that the heel of the front foot is near the arch.

Fourth position

There are two types of fourth position: open and closed. In both cases, one foot is placed approximately twelve inches in front of the other. In open fourth position the heels are aligned, while in closed fourth position the heel of the front foot is aligned with the toe of the back foot.

Fifth position

Fifth position should form two parallel lines with your feet. The heel of the front foot should be in contact with the big toe of the other, and the heel of the back foot should be in contact with the last toe of the front foot.

Lifar's additional positions

Seventh position

Similar to fourth position, but performed en pointe with heels in center with each other. There are two seventh positions, determined by whether the left or right foot is placed in front.

See also

Positions of the arms in ballet

References

Ballet technique
Human positions